I Heard may refer to:

 "I Heard" (song), a song by Hill
 I Heard (film), a 1933 animated short film starring Betty Boop